Wazīr Akbar Khān (1816-1847), born Mohammad Akbar Khān and also known as Amīr Akbar Khān, was an Afghan prince, general, emir for a year, and finally wazir/heir apparent to Dost Mohammad Khan until his death in 1847. His fame began with the 1837 Battle of Jamrud, while attempting to regain Afghanistan's second capital Peshawar from the Sikh Empire.

Wazir Akbar Khan was militarily active in the First Anglo-Afghan War, which lasted from 1839 to 1842. He is prominent for his leadership of the national party in Kabul from 1841 to 1842, and his massacre of Elphinstone's army at the Gandamak pass before the only survivor, the assistant surgeon William Brydon, reached the besieged garrison at Jalalabad on 13 January 1842. Wazir Akbar Khan became the emir of Afghanistan in May 1842, and ruled until Dost Mohammad Khan's return in 1843. In 1847 Wazir Akbar Khan died of cholera.

Early life
Akbar was born as Mohammad Akbar Khan in 1816 to Emir Dost Mohammad Khan of Afghanistan and Mermən Khadija Popalzai. Dost Mohammad Barakzai had 16 wives, 27 sons (including Wazir Akbar Khan) and 25 daughters.

Adult life

In 1836 Dost Mohammad Barakzai's Muslim forces, under the command of his son Wazir Akbar Khan, fought the Sikhs at the Battle of Jamrud, fifteen kilometers west of present-day Peshawar. Dost Mohammad Barakzai did not follow up this triumph by retaking Peshawar, however, but instead contacted Lord Auckland, the new British governor-general in India, for help in fighting the Sikh Empire. With this letter, Dost Mohammad formally set the stage for British intervention in Afghanistan, which would lead to the so-called "Great Game" with Imperial Russia for control over influence in Afghanistan.

Akbar Khan led a revolt in Kabul against the British Indian mission of William McNaughten, Alexander Burnes and their garrison of 4,500 men. In November 1841, he besieged Major-General William Elphinstone's force in Kabul.

Elphinstone accepted a safe-conduct for his British force and about 12,000 Indian camp followers to Peshawar; they were ambushed and annihilated in January 1842. At least one set of British war memoirs bore witness to Akbar Khan’s double dealing, saying that, during the retreat, Akbar Khan could be heard alternately commanding his men, in Persian to desist from, and in Pashto to continue, firing.

In May 1842, Akbar Khan captured Bala Hissar in Kabul and became the new emir of Afghanistan. When Dost Mohammad Khan returned and became the emir in 1843, Akbar Khan was such in a powerful position that he managed to become the wazir and heir apparent to Dost Mohammad. In September 1847 there was a cholera outbreak in Kabul. Akbar Khan contracted the disease and died shortly after.

In fiction
The historical figure Akbar Khan plays a major role in George MacDonald Fraser's novel Flashman.

See also
First Anglo-Afghan War

References

External links

1816 births
1847 deaths
19th-century Afghan monarchs
Emirs of Afghanistan
Barakzai dynasty
Afghan military personnel
People of the First Anglo-Afghan War
Pashtun people
19th-century Afghan politicians
19th-century monarchs in Asia